K195 or K-195 may refer to:

K-195 (Kansas highway), a state highway in Kansas
Litanies (Mozart)
K195, a naval ship